Jan Olaf Immel (born 14 March 1976) is a former German team handball player. He received a silver medal at the 2004 Summer Olympics in Athens with the German national team. His team won the 2004 European Men's Handball Championship in Slovenia.

References

External links

1976 births
Living people
German male handball players
Olympic handball players of Germany
Handball players at the 2004 Summer Olympics
Olympic silver medalists for Germany
Olympic medalists in handball
Medalists at the 2004 Summer Olympics
21st-century German people